IDIA may refer to:

 Idia, a historical figure in Benin
 Idia (moth), a genus of moths in the family Erebidae
 Institute of Diplomacy and International Affairs, a government agency in Taiwan